Herbert Noel Hollingdale (1911 - 2000) was an Australian professional rugby league footballer who played in the New South Wales Rugby League competition.

Playing career
Hollingdale played for the Eastern Suburbs  club in the years  1938–42. A Hooker, Hollingdale played in 53 matches for the club. In 1940 he was a member of Easts' premiership winning team that defeated Canterbury Bankstown 24–14. He also played in two other premiership deciding matches, he was in the side that went down to Canterbury in 1938 - giving that club its first premiership. And in 1941 he was a member of the Easts' side that was defeated by St George in that year's decider, coincidentally it was also that club's first premiership.

Hollingdale died on 20 January 2000, age 88.

References

Sources
 
 Rugby League yearbook: Middleton

Australian rugby league players
Sydney Roosters players
2000 deaths
1911 births
Place of birth missing
Date of birth missing
Place of death missing
Rugby league hookers